Auguste de Creuse, a French portrait painter, who was born at Montrond (Doubs) in 1806, and died in Paris in 1839. He was a pupil of Gros, and painted many of the historical portraits which are at Versailles.

References
 

1806 births
1839 deaths
19th-century French painters
French male painters
French portrait painters
People from Doubs
Pupils of Antoine-Jean Gros
19th-century French male artists